"Waiting Game" is a song by American singer Banks from her second extended play (EP), London (2013). It was written by Banks and Sohn, and produced by the latter. The song was also included on Banks' debut studio album, Goddess (2014). "Waiting Game" charted at number 99 on the UK Singles Chart in January 2014 after being featured in a Victoria's Secret commercial.

Background
Although it was never released as a single, the song was featured in a Victoria's Secret commercial in December 2013, and in January 2014, it charted at number 99 on the UK Singles Chart. The track also reached number 16 on the US Alternative Digital Songs chart in April 2015. The song describes a long-distance relationship.

In July 2014, English girl group Neon Jungle released a cover version of the song on their album Welcome to the Jungle without Banks' knowledge. In response, Banks posted a statement on her Facebook page, explaining she was "shocked" to see the song on their album, describing the song as "my own heartbeats" and having been "born from my real life, my real heartache, my real fingertips when I was at one of the most confusing times in my life". The song would later appear on her debut studio album, Goddess, released in September 2014.

Release and promotion
Banks performed "Waiting Game" on Jimmy Kimmel Live! on August 7, 2014, along with single "Beggin for Thread", making her television debut. It would later be featured in the television shows Reckless (season 1, episode 7), Grey's Anatomy (season 11, episode 3), Mistresses (season 3, episode 1), Power (season 1, episode 7), and The Originals (season 1, episode 4), as well as on the deluxe edition of the soundtrack to the 2014 film Divergent.

Critical reception
The Guardian described the song as "essentially, a [young-adult] novel distilled in song [which] throbs with yearning and lust over evocative drums and static".

Music video
The music video for "Waiting Game" was directed by Francesco Carrozzini and premiered on August 27, 2013.

Credits and personnel
Credits adapted from the liner notes of Goddess.

Recording
 Engineered and mixed at Lion Aboard, London
 Mastered at Infrasonic Sound, Los Angeles
 Published by Warner Chappell Music / Kobalt Songs Music Publishing obo Red Lines Music/Prescription Songs (ASCAP)

Personnel
 Banks – vocals
 Sohn – production, mixing
 Daniel Moyler – engineering
 Pete Lyman – mastering

Charts

Certifications

References

2010s ballads
2013 songs
Banks (singer) songs
Black-and-white music videos
Harvest Records singles
Neon Jungle songs
Songs written by Banks (singer)